KBMI could refer to:

 KJPZ, a radio station (104.1 FM) licensed to serve East Helena, Montana, United States, which held the call sign KBMI-FM from 2013 to 2018
 KRIO-FM, a radio station (97.7 FM) licensed to serve Roma, Texas, United States, and assigned call sign KBMI from 1982 to 2011
 Central Illinois Regional Airport, ICAO code KBMI, an airport serving Bloomington-Normal, Illinois, United States